U-571 is a 2000 submarine film directed by Jonathan Mostow from a screenplay he co-wrote with Sam Montgomery and David Ayer. The film stars Matthew McConaughey, Harvey Keitel, Bill Paxton, Jon Bon Jovi, Jake Weber and Matthew Settle. The film, telling the story of a World War II German submarine boarded by American submariners to capture her Enigma cipher machine, does not represent any real events.

Although the film was financially successful and reasonably well received by critics, and won the Academy Award for Best Sound Editing, the plot attracted substantial criticism. Anger over these inaccuracies reached the House of Commons, where the Prime Minister, Tony Blair, agreed that the film was an "affront" to British sailors. The film was also criticized for portraying German U-boat crews in a negative light by showing them gunning down Allied survivors instead of giving them assistance or taking them aboard as prisoners.

Plot
During the Battle of the Atlantic, after sinking a merchant ship from an Allied convoy, German U-boat U-571 has her engines badly damaged by depth charges from a British destroyer. U-571's skipper Kapitänleutnant Günther Wassner makes a distress call that is intercepted by American intelligence. The US Navy has its submarine S-33 modified to resemble a German resupply U-boat, to try to steal the Enigma machine coding device and sink the U-571. Before the crew of S-33 receives its assignment, the submarine's executive officer Lieutenant Tyler is unhappy about a recommendation for command of his own submarine being blocked by his commanding officer, Lieutenant Commander Dahlgren.

During a storm, S-33's boarding party surprises and overwhelms the crew of U-571. After securing U-571, the American S-33 is torpedoed by the arriving German resupply submarine.  Dahlgren is blown off the deck and seriously wounded; while struggling in the sea he refuses rescue and orders the boarding party on the captured U-boat immediately to submerge. Tyler takes command of U-571 and dives below the surface, where they subsequently engage and sink the resupply submarine.

After making repairs and restoring its power, Tyler decides to route the disabled submarine toward Land's End in Cornwall. However, they are spotted by a German reconnaissance plane, which is unaware that U-571 has been commandeered by Americans. A nearby German destroyer sends over some crew, but before they arrive, Tyler gives orders to fire a shot from the deck gun, which destroys the ship's radio room, preventing it from reporting the situation and revealing that the Allies have the Enigma. The submarine then dives beneath the German destroyer, which begins to drop depth charges. U-571's Kapitänleutnant Wassner escapes captivity, and kills one of Tyler's crew, but he is subdued before he can sabotage the engines.

Tyler attempts to deceive the destroyer into stopping its attack, by ejecting debris and a dead crew member out of a torpedo tube, faking their own destruction. However, the destroyer continues to drop depth charges. U-571 drops below , and is damaged by high water pressure. They start to sink, and can only reverse this by ascending uncontrollably. Tyler orders crewman Trigger to submerge himself in the bilge under water to repressurize the single remaining torpedo tube.

Trigger uses an air hose to breathe inside the flooded compartment. He closes the air valve to the stern tube, but finds a second leak, which he can't reach. The crew realizes that Wassner, despite being shackled, is using Morse Code to tap out a signal that the submarine had been captured, so Hirsch kills him. U-571 surfaces heavily damaged and begins to flood, unable to fire its last torpedo. The pursuing destroyer fires with its main guns: the damage pins Trigger's legs when he is beyond reach of the air hose. Unable to turn back, he manages to close the valve just before he drowns. Tyler orders Tank to fire the torpedo; the destroyer is unable to take evasive action and is sunk. As the crew sighs in relief, Tank reports Trigger's death. However, the submarine has taken severe damage, and so the crew abandons it with the Enigma in their possession. They watch U-571 as it slips beneath the waves once and for all. They are eventually spotted and rescued from their lifeboat by a US Navy PBY Catalina flying boat.

Cast
 Matthew McConaughey as Lieutenant Andrew Tyler
 Bill Paxton as Lieutenant Commander Mike Dahlgren
 Harvey Keitel as Chief Gunner's Mate Henry Klough
 Jon Bon Jovi as Lieutenant Pete Emmett
 David Keith as Major Matthew Coonan
 Jake Weber as Lieutenant Michael Hirsch
 Jack Noseworthy as Seaman Bill Wentz
 Tom Guiry as Seaman Ted "Trigger" Fitzgerald
 Will Estes as Torpedoman Ronald "Rabbit" Parker
 T. C. Carson as Seaman Eddie Carson
 Erik Palladino as Seaman Anthony Mazzola
 Dave Power as Motor Machinist Charles "Tank" Clemens
 Derk Cheetwood as Seaman Herb Griggs
 Matthew Settle as Ensign Keith Larson
 Thomas Kretschmann as Kapitänleutnant Günther Wassner
 Gunter Würger as Oberleutnant zur See Kohl
 Oliver Stokowski as Electro-Obermaschinist Hans
 Burnell Tucker as Admiral Duke
 Paul McEvoy (uncredited) as German Captain

Production

U-571 was filmed in the Mediterranean, near Rome and Malta. A non-diving replica of the US submarine S-33 is located in Grand Harbour, Valletta.

In the U.S. the film was originally rated "R", because of a scene where Lt. Emmett is beheaded by flying debris. To get a "PG-13", the shot was redone with Emmett instead knocked overboard. This left the audience not knowing what had happened to his character. A death scene was also filmed for Major Coonan, but the effect did not work well, so it was cut.

Critical reception
The film was generally well received by critics. On Rotten Tomatoes, the film holds a score of 67% based on 116 reviews, with an average rating of 6.30/10. The consensus reads: "Excellent cinematography and an interesting plot accompanied by a talented cast and crew make U-571 a tense thriller." It performed well at the box office.  Metacritic assigned the film a weighted average score of 62 out of 100, based on 35 critics, indicating "generally favorable reviews".

Awards and nominations
The film was nominated for two awards at the 73rd Academy Awards: Best Sound (Steve Maslow, Gregg Landaker, Rick Kline and Ivan Sharrock) and Best Sound Editing. It won the sound editing award.

Historical correlation

Historical inaccuracies

The film does not portray any historical event. The British Royal Navy had captured the first naval Enigma machine in May 1941, before the US had entered the war. The American portrayal offended many of the British military and public. The Allies captured Enigma-related codebooks and machines about fifteen times during the War; all but two of these by British forces. The Royal Canadian Navy captured U-744 in March 1944 and the U.S. Navy seized  in June 1944. By this time, the Allies were already routinely decoding German naval Enigma traffic.

On the film's release, Labour MP Brian Jenkins used Prime Minister's Questions in June 2000 to state that the film was an "affront to the memories of the British sailors who lost their lives on this action." Prime Minister Tony Blair said, "I agree entirely with what you say... we hope that people realise these are people that, in many cases, sacrificed their lives in order that this country remained free." The director of the local Horsforth Museum  lamented the rewriting of history, saying: "You can't rewrite history and we have to pass on the facts to the younger generation through the schools."

In 1942, the Royal Navy also seized , capturing additional Enigma codebooks. According to Britain's Channel 4, "the captured codebooks provided vital assistance to British cryptographers such as Alan Turing, at the code-breaking facility of Bletchley Park."

The United States' involvement in the European Theatre of the Second World War did not commence until mid-1941 with Lend-Lease, and direct, open participation did not begin until the U.S. Navy began engaging the Kriegsmarine in the fall of 1941, months before Pearl Harbor, by which time Enigma machines had already been captured and their codes broken in Europe. An earlier military Enigma had been examined by Polish Intelligence in 1928; the Polish Cipher Bureau broke the Enigma code in 1932 and gave their findings to Britain and France in 1939, just before the German invasion of Poland.

Sub Lt. David Balme, the Royal Navy officer who led the boarding party on U-110, called U-571, "a great film" and said that it would not have been financially viable without being "americanised". The film's producers did not agree to his request for a statement that it was a work of fiction, but the end credits dedicate the film to the "Allied sailors and officers who risked their lives capturing Enigma materials" during the Second World War. The credits acknowledge the Royal Navy's role in capturing Enigma machines and code documents from U-110,  U-559 and the U.S. Navy's capture of U-505.

In 2006, screenwriter David Ayer admitted that U-571 had distorted history, and said that he would not do it again. He told BBC Radio 4's The Film Programme that he "did not feel good" about suggesting that Americans, rather than the British, had captured the naval Enigma cipher: "It was a distortion...a mercenary decision...to create this parallel history in order to drive the film for an American audience. Both my grandparents were officers in the Second World War, and I would be personally offended if somebody distorted their achievements."

Technical inaccuracies
The Kriegsmarine destroyers rarely ventured out into the open Atlantic Ocean, but usually stayed in European coastal waters. During the destroyer's depth charge attack more than eighty depth charges are detonated in the film, despite the fact that they rarely carried more than thirty.

The German resupply U-boat would most likely not have been sunk by U-571. This would have been difficult for a German U-boat to achieve, as German sonar was not as advanced as British during the war. The only instance of a submerged submarine sinking another submerged vessel was in February 1945 when  sank  with torpedoes.

German Type XIV supply U-boats or Milchkühe ("milk cows") did not have torpedo tubes or deck guns, being armed only with anti-aircraft guns for defense, and therefore could not have attacked other vessels.

One character mentions  sinking in a test dive. The real S-26 did not sink in a test dive, instead sinking in a collision with a patrol combatant, in January 1942.

Inaccurate portrayal of U-boat sailors
The film portrays U-boat sailors machine-gunning Allied merchant crewmen who have survived their ship's sinking, so that they are not able to report the U-boat's position. In reality, U-boat crewmen are far more often known to have assisted survivors with food, directions and occasionally medical aid. Such assistance only stopped after Admiral Karl Dönitz issued the "Laconia order" following a U.S. air attack on U-boats transporting injured survivors under a Red Cross flag in 1942. German U-boat crews were thereafter under War Order No. 154 not to rescue survivors, which parallelled Allied policy. Afterward, U-boats still occasionally provided aid for survivors. In fact, out of several thousand sinkings of merchant ships in World War II, there is only one case of a U-boat's crew deliberately attacking the survivors: that of  after the sinking of the Greek ship Peleus in 1944.

Actual fates of U-571, S-33 and Z-49
The actual , captained by Oberleutnant zur See Gustav Lüssow, was never involved in any such events, was not captured, but was in fact lost with all hands on 28 January 1944, west of Ireland. She was hit by depth charges, dropped from a Short Sunderland Mk III flying boat, EK577, callsign "D for Dog", belonging to No. 461 Squadron, Royal Australian Air Force (RAAF)  and based at RAF Pembroke Dock in Wales.  The aircraft's commander, Flt Lt Richard Lucas, reported that most of the U-boat's 52 crew managed to abandon ship, but all died from hypothermia.

The real  was stationed in the Pacific Ocean from June 1942 until the end of the war. She was sold for scrap in 1946.

The Kriegsmarine destroyer Z-49 was ordered on 12 June 1943 but never laid down, let alone completed and sailed.

See also
 Submarine films
 History of cryptology – World War II cryptology

References

Sources

External links
 
 
 U-571 at the TCM Movie Database 
 
 
 
 BBC Movies 11 January 2001: U-571 (2000) 
 BBC Movies: American Histories - How The War Wasn't Won 
 The Guardian, 26 February 2009: U-571: You give historical films a bad name

2000 films
2000s action war films
American action war films
Films about anti-fascism
English-language French films
French action films
StudioCanal films
Universal Pictures films
U-boat fiction
World War II submarine films
Films that won the Best Sound Editing Academy Award
Films directed by Jonathan Mostow
Films produced by Dino De Laurentiis
Films produced by Martha De Laurentiis
Films with screenplays by David Ayer
Films about submarine warfare
Films about the United States Navy
Films set in the Atlantic Ocean
Film controversies
Film controversies in the United States
French war drama films
French World War II films
2000s American films
2000s French films